The Allen Brothers may refer to the following musical groups:

 The Allen Brothers (American duo) 1930s country music duo, Austin and Lee Allen
 The Allen Brothers (Australia) 1960s band of Peter Allen and Chris Bell

See also 
 Allen Brothers, a purveyor of prime steaks headquartered in Chicago, IL